Shangxi may refer to the following locations in China:

 Shanxi, sometimes misspelled as Shangxi
 Shangxi, Zhejiang (上溪镇)
 Shangxi Township (上溪乡), Yongfeng County, Jiangxi